David Copperfield is a BBC television serial starring Ian McKellen in the title role of the adaptation of Charles Dickens's 1850 novel that began airing in January 1966. It also featured Tina Packer as Dora Flora Robson as Betsey Trotwood, Gordon Gostelow as Barkis, and Christopher Guard as young David. The screenplay adaptation was written by Vincent Tilsley, who had previously helmed the 1956 adaptation almost a decade prior.

It had a viewership of over 12 million for its initial airings. Only four of the serial's thirteen episodes (3, 8, 9 and 11) are known to exist. It is said to be remarkably similar to the 1956 adaptation that preceded it, although that version is now completely lost.

Plot
For a detailed plot, see David Copperfield (novel).

Cast

Archive status
After being rebroadcast in the late 1960s, the original master videotapes for all thirteen episodes were wiped by the BBC. The 16mm telerecordings made for preservation were junked sometime afterwards, most likely in the 1970s. Only four episodes (3 "A Long Journey", 8 "The Proposal", 9 "Domestic Tangles" and 11 "Umble Aspirations") are known to exist with the BFI, with episode 3 existing in the highest quality. Episodes 8, 9 and 11 suffer from notably lower sound and picture quality. Additionally, unedited studio footage of episode 3, featuring outtakes, mid-take conversations between actors and even director Joan Craft telling the crew to "shut up", is also held by the BFI and available for private viewing at their building on Stephen Street, London. All four episodes are available to view for free at their Southbank building via the Mediatheque service.

Critical reception
The BFI's Screenonline wrote "while this adaptation is occasionally light in the playing (comic music punctuates some of Micawber's gesticulations), it doesn't avoid the novel's tough incidents, and its length allows an unusual faithfulness to incident and character (finding room for Traddles and others omitted from shorter adaptations)." Sir Ian Kellen himself later said, "I was new to television and got absorbed in the technicalities of it all: characterization was forced, I expect, and I'm very glad the original videotape has been destroyed."

References

External links
 
 
 

BBC television dramas
Television series set in the 1850s
1966 British television series debuts
1966 British television series endings
1960s British drama television series
Television shows based on David Copperfield
Lost BBC episodes